WXVE is an American radio station, licensed to the city of Latrobe, Pennsylvania. WXVE operates at 1570 kHz with a maximum power of 1,000 watts day, 220 watts night. The station is owned by Robert and Ashley Stevens' Broadcast Communications, Inc., through licensee Broadcast Communications III, Inc.

History

First in Latrobe
WXVE first signed on the air as WAKU on December 12, 1951, making it the second AM station to come on the air in Westmoreland County, as WHJB (now WKHB) had been the first in 1934. A second station, WTRA (now WCNS) came on the air five years later after WAKU's debut.

WAKU was originally owned by Clearfield Broadcasters, Inc., which owned and published the Clearfield Progress newspaper, headquartered in Clearfield, Pennsylvania; as well as radio station WCPA. The newspaper was looking to expand its advertising reach by building or buying radio stations in nearby markets, and would do so with further acquisitions in Indiana and Centre counties. The station initially signed on the air as a daytime-only station, with a maximum power output of 250 watts, with studios at 200 Depot Street in downtown Latrobe.

WAKU, which by this time relocated to 215 Church Street, was granted permission in 1955 to increase its power to a full 1,000 watts; its current power output today. 

In 1957, Clearfield Broadcasting decided to sell WAKU, as they were preparing to acquire Indiana County-based WDAD and WQMU, a transaction that would be completed in 1958. WAKU was sold to WAKU, Inc., a company headed by Harry Reed on July 1, 1956. This would mark the first of several transactions over the next decade.

In 1959, WAKU was acquired by Rosenblum Stations, which also owned WISR in Butler, and WACB in Kittanning, as well as two other stations in Ohio. The call letters were then changed to WSHH, which were later acquired by a Pittsburgh FM station that still uses these same call letters today. Rosenblum Stations, however, sold WSHH to Tayloradio, in 1962. This period of ownership would also not last long, as WAKU (the station had returned to its original call sign) was sold to Westmoreland Broadcasting Corporation in February 1963, assigned the callsign WQTW, and was under the management of John Jay Stewart. In the mid '60s, WQTW featured popular radio personalities such as Tom Sidwell, John Vincze, Jim Albright and Joe Gearing and played a Top 40 and Rock & Roll format.

Westmoreland Broadcasting remained WQTW's owner until October 31, 1973, when it was acquired by Regency Broadcasting Corporation.

Fire
WQTW experienced a major setback on New Year's Eve of 1982, when its studios and offices at 348 Main Street were destroyed in a fire, leaving the station dark for about a year and a half , and keeping local firefighters busy for about six hours that day. The station then opened a temporary office in Building 3 of the Latrobe Industrial Park, along Abbot Street in Derry Township.

The license and tower, being all that was left from the station, were then advertised for sale. Stan Wall, owner of WLSW, 15 miles south of Latrobe, purchased the remains of the station for $66,000 in April 1984.

Return
Upon purchasing the station, WQTW had to be returned to the air quickly in order to avoid forfeiture of the FCC license. A double-wide mobile home was purchased and parked at WQTW's transmitter site on George Street in Derry Township, just on the outskirts of Latrobe. The station returned to the air less than six months later with a full-service format of middle-of-the road and oldies music, with polka music on the weekends.

A construction permit was granted for the station in 1989 to move down the dial to 880 AM (still daytime-only but with almost double the coverage), but that permit was abandoned the following year when the station was granted nighttime power of 220 watts.

In 1990, the station began simulcasting WLSW full-time over WQTW. Specialty programs of high school football, weekend oldies and polka programming remained independent of WLSW.

Since 1990, WQTW has been leased to two other operators through time-brokerage agreements, though the formats they adopted were short lived. For a brief period in the mid-'90s, the station affiliated with the Prime Sports Satellite Network, in an attempt to support the growing audience for all-sports radio.

Effective July 25, 2017, the estate of Stanley Wall sold WQTW and WLSW to Robert and Ashley Stevens' Broadcast Communications, Inc. for $605,000. The station went silent December 15 of that year. It was one of two silent AM stations the Stevenses purchased in late 2017, the other being Pittsburgh's KQV. The station changed its call sign to WKHJ on September 28, 2018, and then to WXVE on August 19, 2020.

Previous logo

References
 Disk jockey and station owner Stan Wall shaped the region's radio 
 1953 Broadcasting Yearbook
 1955 Broadcasting Yearbook
 1957 Broadcasting Yearbook
 1960 Broadcasting Yearbook
 1961-62 Broadcasting Yearbook
 1967 Broadcasting Yearbook
 1975 Broadcasting Yearbook
 1981 Broadcasting Yearbook

External links

XVE
Radio stations established in 1951
1951 establishments in Pennsylvania
XVE